Nagda Junction is a major railway station of Western Railway network. Nagda Junction is A – category railway station of Western Railway Zone of Indian Railways. Its code is NAD. It serves Nagda town. The station consists of five platforms.

It is an important halt for all trains that are bound for Mumbai, Delhi, Pune, Indore, Bhopal, Jabalpur, Jodhpur, Jaipur, Bikaner, Bilaspur, Dehradun, Amritsar, Chandigarh, Hyderabad, Chennai, Bengaluru, Mysore,  Patna, Kanpur, Lucknow, Gorakhpur, Muzaffarpur, Varanasi, Darbhanga, Guwahati, Kolkata, Katra, Nagpur, Ahmedabad and Somnath.

Gallery

References

Railway junction stations in Madhya Pradesh
Railway stations in Ujjain district
Ratlam railway division